Omorgus perhispidus is a species of hide beetle in the subfamily Omorginae.Found within Australia.

References

perhispidus
Beetles described in 1904